The Northern Lights is a named British passenger train operated by London North Eastern Railway. It runs daily in each direction between London King's Cross and Aberdeen via the East Coast Main Line and Edinburgh to Aberdeen Line. The northbound service departs London King's Cross at 10:00am, and the southbound service departs Aberdeen at 09:52am. London North Eastern Railway operates another two services in each direction between London and Aberdeen as well as one each day to and from Leeds.

Operation 
Presently both of the services are operated by a Class 800 Azuma. This is a bi-modal train due to the line being diesel only beyond Haymarket, with the train being on electric power to and from the latter.

Until December 2019, the Northern Lights service was operated by an InterCity 125 HST for a number of years until the whole fleet of HSTs were replaced by the Azuma fleet.

References

East Coast Main Line
Named passenger trains of the United Kingdom